Cara Black and Liezel Huber were the defending champions, but Huber did not compete this year. Black teamed up with Elena Likhovtseva and lost in semifinals to tournament winners Svetlana Kuznetsova and Arantxa Sánchez Vicario.

Kuznetsova and Sánchez Vicario defeated Petra Mandula and Patricia Wartusch 6–2, 6–4 in the final.

Seeds

Draw

Draw

References

External links
 Official results archive (ITF)
 Official results archive (WTA)

Doubles
Toyota Princess Cup - Doubles